Abdurrahman Yalçınkaya (born 10 March 1950 in Şanlıurfa, Turkey) is a high-ranking Turkish judge and the former Chief Public Prosecutor (between 2007–2011) of the Supreme Court of Appeals of Turkey. Since the end of his term on 2011, he has been a member of the Supreme Court of Appeals' Eight Civil Department.

Party closure cases

As the highest-ranked Public Prosecutor of Turkey, Abdurrahman Yalcinkaya submitted an indictment before the Constitutional Court demanding the closure of the Democratic Society Party (DTP) on the 16 September 2007. That the DTP demanded education in the native language and a federal administration were viewed as evidence of the party receiving orders by Abdullah Öcalan, the imprisoned leader of the Kurdistan Workers' Party (PKK). The request was successful and on 11 December 2009 the Court of Cassation under the presidency of Haşim Kılıç banned the party with eleven votes, thus making it an unanimous decision. Yalçınkaya also brought charges against the ruling Justice and Development Party (AKP) on 14 March 2008 to the Constitutional Court of Turkey, charging the party for violating the principle of separation of religion and state in Turkey and requesting that the party be closed and its 71 officials barred from politics for five years. Those officials include the current president Abdullah Gül and the prime minister Recep Tayyip Erdoğan. The court confirmed that the party had become "a center for anti-secular activities", but decided not to close the party, imposing a financial penalty as a warning instead by cutting 50% of the state funding to the party.

References

External links
 Abdurrahman Yalçınkaya, High Court of Appeals. 

1950 births
People from Şanlıurfa
Turkish civil servants
Court of Cassation (Turkey) justices
Living people